Stolarczyk is a Polish surname, meaning a "little carpenter". Notable people include:

 Maciej Stolarczyk, Polish football player and manager
 Stanisław Stolarczyk, Polish journalist and writer

Polish-language surnames
Occupational surnames